École polytechnique universitaire de Paris-Saclay (Polytech Paris-Saclay) a French engineering College created in 2004.

The school trains engineers in four sectors : electronics, computing, materials and optronics.

Located in Orsay, Polytech Paris-Saclay is a public higher education institution. The school is a member of the Paris-Saclay University.

References

External links
 Polytech Paris-Saclay

Engineering universities and colleges in France
Essonne
Polytech Paris-Saclay
Paris-Saclay
Paris-Saclay University
Educational institutions established in 2004
2004 establishments in France